Rockholds is an unincorporated community and census-designated place in Whitley County, Kentucky, United States.

Demographics

History
A post office has been open at Rockholds since 1838. The community's name most likely honors Thomas Rockhold, a pioneer merchant.

References

Unincorporated communities in Whitley County, Kentucky
Unincorporated communities in Kentucky
Census-designated places in Knox County, Kentucky
Census-designated places in Kentucky